Pegu frog may refer to:

 Pegu rice frog, a frog found in Asia
 Pegu torrent frog, a frog found in Asia
 Pegu wart frog, a frog endemic to the Western Ghats in southern India

Animal common name disambiguation pages